Cowboys and Aliens or Cowboys & Aliens may refer to:

 Cowboys & Aliens (comics), a 2006 Platinum Studios graphic novel
 Cowboys & Aliens, a 2011 American science fiction Western film, inspired by the comic
 Cowboys and Aliens (album), a 1995 album by British alternative rock/dream pop group Kitchens of Distinction
 "Cowboys & Aliens," a song by Gram Rabbit from their 2004 album, Music to Start a Cult To
 , a Belgium stoner rock band